The Impending Crisis, 1848–1861 is a 1976 nonfiction book by American historian David M. Potter, who had died in 1971. The book was completed by fellow Stanford University professor Don E. Fehrenbacher and published in 1977 by Harper & Row. It was awarded the Pulitzer Prize for History.

References 

1976 non-fiction books
Pulitzer Prize for History-winning works
History books about the United States
Harper & Row books